Ottawa Festivals, a not-for-profit member-based organization, is the Festival Network Office located in Ottawa, Ontario Canada. Established in 1996, the network consists of 53 festivals in the Ottawa region.

History
In the summer of 1994, four new festivals evolved with the objective of showcasing different cultures, arts, and entertainment to the local community. Distinct, yet sharing a common objective, these organizations, namely, Ottawa Bluesfest, CKCU Ottawa Folk Festival, Ottawa Chamber Music Festival, and Fete Caribe, saw a unique opportunity to exchange ideas and experiences and to lend support in each other’s development and growth.

In the fall of 1994, a meeting was called by the president of Ottawa Tourism Commission Authority (OTCA) in response to many public inquiries relating to these new festivals. The goal was to create a communication flow between the festivals and OTCA. During this meeting, there was a consensus that most of the festivals had many common interests and that there was a need to form some ongoing group that could not only coordinate tourism information, but also share ideas to improve their individual events.
After many meetings and brainstorming sessions, the Ottawa Festival Network was formed with an initial board which included prominent personalities like Mark Monahan (Ottawa Bluesfest), Michel Gauthier (Canadian Tulip Festival), Gene Swimmer (Ottawa Folk Festival) and Christine Broughton (OTCA). It was from this initial group that the network flourished and eventually, was successful in liaising with several organizations, such as, Canadian Tourism Commission, City of Ottawa, and Human Resource Development Canada, to name a few.
In April, 1996 the Ottawa Festival Network became an incorporated entity with a group of diverse not-for-profit member festivals representing different cultures, arts, and entertainment.
April 2006 brought a landmark when the Ottawa Festival Network celebrated its 10th Anniversary with the “Launch of the Festival Season”. This event brought celebrated Ottawa’s multi-million dollar festival industry and the decade-long involvement of the Ottawa Festival Network in showcasing and promoting art, culture and entertainment in Canada’s National Capital Region. This event presented the unveiling of the new official name (Ottawa Festivals d’Ottawa), the logo, the 10th anniversary brochure, and the new and revised official Web site. The launch highlighted the growth of the festival industry over the past decade and how it has contributed to the local tourism and economy.

The predecessor to ‘Ottawa Festivals’ was the National Capital Region Festival Network in 1986. This was the first initiative by festivals to work together. At that time, the City of Ottawa did not formally recognize festivals as a means of economic development; with the potential to stimulate more tourism. The organizers consisted of Peter Harris Festival of the Arts, Elizabeth Bhil Ottawa Jazz Festival, Pierre de Blois Festival Franco-Ontarien, Greg Larsen Ottawa Tulip Festival and Michel Gauthier Winterlude.

The group was responsible for convincing municipal politicians that festivals should be recognized as more than local community recreation. In conjunction with staff at the Culture Division of the City of Ottawa, these ‘festival pioneers’ developed categories for events by establishing different levels of criteria. As a result, a new festival program was created. Festivals were now able to apply for annual funding in the years to come.

Festival members
 Winterlude
 Ottawa Irish Festival
 Maple Sugar Festival
 Ottawa International Writers Festival - Spring Edition
 Victoria Day Festival
 Canadian Tulip Festival
 Ottawa International Children's Festival
 Ottawa Marathon
 Carnival of Cultures
 Canada Dance Festival
 Magnetic North Theatre Festival
 Italian Week
 Westfest
 Festival Franco Ontarien
 Ottawa Fringe Festival
 Ottawa Dragon Boat Festival
 Summer Solstice Aboriginal Arts Festival
 TD Canada Trust Ottawa International Jazz Festival
 Canada Day Arts Festival
 Unisong Canadian Choir Festival
 Canada Day
 Ottawa Bluesfest
  Sound and Light Show on Parliament Hill/Son et lumière
 HOPE Volleyball Summerfest
 The Great India Festival (formerly, Festival of India)
 Ottawa Turkish Festival
 Orchestras in the Park
 Ottawa International Chamber Music Festival
 Ottawa Lumière Festival
 Navan Fair
 Ottawa Greekfest
 Ottawa Folk Festival
 SuperEx
 Ottawa Reggae Festival
 Capital Pride
 Capital Vélo Fest
 Richmond Fair
 Carp Fair
 Metcalfe Fair
 Fall Rhapsody
 Ontario Council of Folk Festivals Conference
 Ottawa International Animation Festival
 Ottawa International Writers Festival - Fall Edition
 Lebanorama
 Ottawa Storytelling Festival
 Canadian Folk Music Awards
 3i Summit: Imagine - Interact - Inspire
 Christmas Lights Across Canada
 Festival X
 Music and Beyond
 South Asian Festival
 Summer Fling – A Theatrical Affair!
 Latin Sparks Festival

References

2. http://www.ottawafestivals.ca/ottawa-411/

3. http://www.ottawafestivals.ca/ottawa-411/other-things-to-do/

External links
 Ottawa Festivals 

Festivals
Arts organizations established in 1996
 
Festival organizations